Jamin Winans (born December 4, 1977) is an American filmmaker. He is known for his short film Spin (2005) and feature films 11:59 (2005), Ink (2009) and The Frame (2014).

Early life and training 
Winans was born in Fort Wayne, Indiana, and moved with his family to Denver, Colorado when he was five. Later moving to nearby Evergreen, Colorado, he attended Bergen Elementary, and began making movies with pieces of string and cardboard at age 10. In an extended interview with Jason Heller of Westword, Winans recalls,
After high school at Evergreen High School, he attended Columbia College Hollywood in Los Angeles before dropping out and pursuing filmmaking in Colorado.

Production company 
Winans created Double Edge Films in 1998. Winans plays various roles in each film, most significantly as writer, director, and editor, and more recently composing scores; his spouse, Kiowa Winans, is intimately involved with the effort, in roles as producer, but also in art direction, and sound and costume design. Jamin Winans began showing shorts at film festivals around the U.S. in 2001.

Film career 

Winans made his first short film, Blanston, (2003), a film depicting four people trying to pull an insurance scam on the company they worked for.  His next, a short called The Maze (2003), is about a physicist trying to understand the science of the universe. Next, Winans released Spin (2005), the story of a DJ trying to fix a chain of events unfolding a city's downtown area, a film that has won multiple film festival awards, including Best Live Action Short and The Bruce Corwin Award at the 2006 Santa Barbara Independent Film Festival  (and has >15 million hits at YouTube). His first feature, 11:59 (2005), portrays a photojournalist trying to remember what happened in the last twenty-four hours of his life, and premiered at the 2005 Montreal World Film Festival.

Winans next released Ink (2009), a film portraying the struggle of a father trying to save his comatose daughter, who is floating between dreams and nightmares.  In the first week of its release, "Ink" shot into the Top 20 movies on IMDb due to being heavily pirated on peer-to-peer networks .

His next film, a 5-minute short, Uncle Jack (2010) relates the story of a desperate fugitive trying to narrate a bedtime story has several hundred thousand clicks on YouTube.

In late 2014, Winans released his latest feature film, The Frame, which he wrote, directed, and scored.  "The Frame" is about two strangers colliding in an impossible way - taking on the very root of fate, destiny, and their own existence, they race through a maze of an ever-changing universe while being pursued by a demonic man determined to erase the world see .

Musical composition 
In addition to his writing, directing, and editing, Winans also composes original music for film. Winans composed the musical score for Ink (2009), and his song, The City Surf from Ink was used in the climactic scene of the Liam Neeson film, The Grey, in conjunction with a score composed by Marc Streitenfeld.

In Winans latest feature film, The Frame (2014), Winans again composed the score.

Commercial work 
In addition to films, Winans also works on commercials .

Filmography

As writer, director, and editor 
 Blanston (2003, short film)
 The Maze (2003, short film)
 Spin (2005, short film)
 11:59 (2005)
 Brooklyn Independent Vol. 1 (2005, Video)
 Ink (2009)
 Uncle Jack (2010, short film)
 The Frame (2014)
 Childhood 2.0 (2020, Documentary) (with Robert Muratore and Kiowa K. Winans)

As composer 
 Blanston (2003, short film)
 The Maze (2003, short film)
 Spin (2005, short film)
 Ink (2009)
 Uncle Jack (2010, short film)
 The Frame (2014)
 Childhood 2.0 (2020, Documentary)

Personal life 

Winans is married to production collaborator Kiowa Winans, a native of Colorado whose family was originally from New England.

References

Further reading 
 Jason Heller, 2014, "From Ink to The Frame, Jamin and Kiowa Winans Are Making Their Mark in the Movies," at Westword (magazine, online), October 15, 2014, see , accessed 4 May 2015.
 Daniel Anderson, 2011, "DVD Review - Ink," Click (online), April 19, 2011, see , accessed 29 August 2011.
 Brendon Connelly, 2011, "The Nightmare Fantasy Film Ink, According To Its Director Jamin Winans," Bleeding Cool (online), April 15, 2011, see , accessed 29 August 2011.
 Natalie Gallacher, 2011, "Interview: Jamin Winans," The Film Pilgrim (online), April 17, 2011.
 Jason Heller, 2011, "Ink's Jamin Winans finds hope in dark places," The A.V. Club (online), March 13, 2011, see , accessed 29 August 2011.
 Amber Wilkinson, 2011, "Bringing Ink to life," Eye for Film (online), April 14, 2011, see , accessed 29 August 2011.

External links 
 
 

1977 births
Living people
American filmmakers
American male composers
21st-century American composers
People from Evergreen, Colorado
21st-century American male musicians